KTJA-LP was an Azteca América-affiliate television station, owned and operated by Una Vez Más Holdings, LLC of Dallas, Texas and operating on UHF channel 51. The station rebroadcast Houston's KYAZ.

The station's license was cancelled by the Federal Communications Commission on June 9, 2014, for failure to file a license renewal application.

External links
 

Television stations in Texas
Spanish-language television stations in Texas
Defunct television stations in the United States
Television channels and stations disestablished in 2014
2014 disestablishments in Texas
TJA-LP